The Majada River is a river of Salinas and Cayey that flows near La Plena community in Quebrada Yeguas barrio, about 30 miles south of San Juan. The river has an average daily discharge of 2.9 cubic feet per second and a drainage area of 16.7 miles.

See also
List of rivers of Puerto Rico

References

External links
 USGS Hydrologic Unit Map – Caribbean Region (1974)
Rios de Puerto Rico

Rivers of Puerto Rico